The 1962 United States Senate election in Wisconsin was held on November 6, 1962.  Incumbent Republican U.S. Senator Alexander Wiley ran for re-election to a fifth term in office but was defeated by Democratic Governor Gaylord A. Nelson.

General

Candidates
 Gaylord A. Nelson (D), Governor of Wisconsin
 Alexander Wiley (R), incumbent U.S. senator
 William O. Hart (Independent)
 Georgia Cozzini (Socialist Labor)
 Wayne Leverenz (Socialist Workers)

Results

See also
United States Senate elections, 1962

References

Wisconsin
1962
1962 Wisconsin elections